Eupithecia lithographata is a moth in the  family Geometridae. It is found in Iran.

References

Moths described in 1887
lithographata
Moths of the Middle East